Ryan Edwards may refer to:

 Ryan Edwards (American soccer) (born 1976), retired American soccer defender
 Ryan Edwards (Australian soccer) (born 1993), Australian soccer midfielder
 Ryan Edwards (English footballer) (born 1993), English football defender
 Ryan Edwards (rugby union) (born 1990), English rugby union player
 Ryan Edwards (musician), former drummer with The Lines